This is a list of albums based on the Care Bears franchise.

1980s
(all from Kid Stuff Records)
Introducing the Care Bears (1982)
The Care Bears Care For You (1983)
Adventures in Care-a-lot (1983)
The Care Bears' Christmas (1983)
The Care Bears Birthday Party (1984)
The Care Bears Movie: Original Soundtrack Album (1985)
Care Bears Movie II: Original Soundtrack Recording (1986)
Friends Make Everything Better (1986)

2000s
From Madacy Kids:
Meet the Care Bears (2004)
Journey to Joke-a-lot Soundtrack (2004)
Care Bears Holiday Hugs (2004)
Care Bears Karaoke: Sing Like a Star (2004) - Two CD set. Consists of Care Bears Karaoke: Sing Like A Star!, and Care Bears: Sing Along Favorites. The karaoke CD is a CD-G enhanced Audio CD and will only display lyrics on CD-G enabled players. 
Care Bears Nighty-Night (2005)
Care Bears Christmas Eve  (2006)
Care Bears: Let's Be Friends (2006) - released only as a digital download on various digital music stores, as well as on Wal-Mart's custom CD service. Consequently, it is very difficult to acquire the album legally when outside the US as many online stores refuse to sell to international customers.
Care Bears: Share A Smile (2006) - Combined into Care Bears: Let's Be Friends.

From Kids Jukebox:
Care Bears: Music for Me (2006) - Customizable album, requires name to be sent in to publisher.
Care Bears: My Music (2008) - Re-released version of Care Bears: Music for Me, no longer requires a special online purchase but requires special software be installed on the PC and a valid internet connection to be present/

2020s
From Arts Music:
Care Bears Kids Hits - Vol. 1 (2021)
Care Bears: Unlock the Music (2021)

Albums
Film and television discographies